The Wencl Kajer Farmstead is a historic farmhouse located in New Market, Minnesota. It consists of a 1920 brick farmhouse and a  gambrel-roofed round barn, built in 1918 by Kajer. It is listed on the National Register of Historic Places.

References

Houses in Scott County, Minnesota
Houses completed in 1920
Houses on the National Register of Historic Places in Minnesota
Farms on the National Register of Historic Places in Minnesota
Round barns in Minnesota
National Register of Historic Places in Scott County, Minnesota
1918 establishments in Minnesota